The House at 203 Islington Road is a historic house at 203 Islington Road in Newton, Massachusetts. It is an elaborately decorated Late Victorian house, built in buff-colored stone with dark brick trim elements. Built in 1870, it is the only surviving element of a larger estate (known as "Islington") built by Ezra Winslow; the main estate house, overlooking the nearby Charles River, has long been demolished. It was briefly featured in episode 1 of the 31st season of the PBS television series This Old House (2009).

The house was listed on the National Register of Historic Places in 1986.

See also
 National Register of Historic Places listings in Newton, Massachusetts

References

Houses on the National Register of Historic Places in Newton, Massachusetts
Gothic Revival architecture in Massachusetts
Houses completed in 1870